Samai Rum Distillery is a Cambodian premium rum manufacturer in Phnom Penh founded in 2014. The first rum distillery in the country. It was founded by Diego Wilkins, Daniel Pacheco and Antonio Lopez.

Samai Distillery was selected as one of 10 startup distilleries for Diageo's distillery incubation programme. Since then its rums have won numerous awards from across the world such as San Francisco World Spirits Competition, the London International Spirits Challenge, the Singapore World Spirits Competition and the Miami International Rum Conference. Currently, the distillery exports around 30% of its production to Singapore, France and Spain, while the remaining 70% is sold domestically. 

In 2020, after the start of the COVID-19 pandemic, Samai Distillery began producing hand sanitizer from the distillation fraction previously used for disinfecting equipment.

Production 
Samai Distillery produces añejo rum using traditional handmade 500-litre copper pot stills. It sources its sugarcane from eastern regions of the Koh Kong Province to produce three kinds of rums – Samai Gold Rum flavoured with Mondulkiri wild honey, Samai PX Limited Edition Rum aged in Sherry American oak barrels and Kampot Pepper Rum spiced with Kampot pepper.

See also

References

External links
Official website
Chandarith Doung (15 December 2018). Buckle up and get to know the marvelous story of first rum makers in Cambodia. Foodbuzz.site

Rums
Cambodian brands
Food and drink companies of Cambodia
Companies based in Phnom Penh